The 2010 South American Rugby Championship "B" was the 11th edition of the second-tier competition of the leading national Rugby Union teams in South America.
Division B was organised in Medellin (Colombia) from 24 to 31 October 2010. Participating nations were Colombia, holder, Peru, Venezuela and Costa Rica.

Meanwhile, was played the Under-20 tournament, won by Colombia.

In the main championship the winner was Peru

Standings

{| class="wikitable"
|-
!width=165|Team
!width=40|Played
!width=40|Won
!width=40|Drawn
!width=40|Lost
!width=40|For
!width=40|Against
!width=40|Difference
!width=40|BP
!width=40|Pts
|- bgcolor=#ccffcc align=center
|align=left| 
|3||3||0||0||95||17||+78||0||9
|- align=center
|align=left| 
|3||2||0||1||62||45|||+17||0||6
|- align=center
|align=left| 
|3||1||0||2||94||55||+39||0||3
|- align=center
|align=left| 
|3||0||0||3||17||151||−134||0||0
|}

Matches

External links
Details

References

2010
2010 rugby union tournaments for national teams
B
rugby union
rugby union
rugby union
rugby union
International rugby union competitions hosted by Colombia

it:Campionato sudamericano di rugby 2010